Lazar Ranđelović (born 5 August 1997) is a Serbian professional footballer who plays as a winger for Russian Premier League club Ural Yekaterinburg.

Club career

Early career
Born in Leskovac, Ranđelović came through the youth categories of the local club Sloga Leskovac. In summer 2015, he moved to the Serbian League East side Jedintvo Bošnjace. Playing with the club he appeared scored a single goal on 21 match in the during the 2015–16 campaign. Next he joined Radan Lebane, where he played for the rest of 2016, making 15 appearances with 4 goals.

Radnički Niš
After passing trial in early 2017, Ranđelović signed his first four-year professional contract with the Radnički Niš, and shortly after he was loaned to Car Konstantin until the end of the 2016–17 season. Returning from loan, Ranđelović passed the summer pre-season with Radnički after which he was also licensed for the competitive matches. He made his professional debut in the opening fixture of the 2017–18 Serbian SuperLiga campaign, replacing Marko Mrkić in the 73rd minute of the away game against Red Star Belgrade.

He then moved on loan to the Serbian First League club Dinamo Vranje, where he scored 9 goals on 26 matches and contributed to their promotion to the top tier.

Olympiacos
On 30 August 2018, Ranđelović signed with Greek club Olympiacos for an undisclosed fee. It was a agreed that he would stay with his former club Radnički Niš on loan for the 2018–19 season. At the beginning of the 2018–19 Serbian SuperLiga campaign, Ranđelović adapted as an inverted left winger. Following the domestic league matches he made his continental debut in the second leg of the second qualifying round of the Europa League against Maccabi Tel Aviv, when he assisted to Aleksandar Stanisavljević for 2–2 draw.

By the end of the 2018–19 season, he scored a total of seven goals and made eight assists, convincing Olympiacos to bring him back from loan. On 21 August 2019, he scored a brace coming on as a substitute in a 4–0 home win game against Krasnodar in the Champions League play-off.

On the deadline day of the 2021 summer transfer window, Ranđelović moved to Spanish Segunda División side CD Leganés on a one-year loan deal.

Ural Yekaterinburg
On 9 September 2022, Ranđelović signed with Russian Premier League club FC Ural Yekaterinburg.

International career
Ranđelović got his first call in Serbia U21 team by coach Goran Đorović in september 2018.

He scored the first goal in his debut against North Macedonia on 7 September 2018.

Career statistics

Club

International

Honours

Club
Olympiacos
Super League Greece: 2019–20, 2020–21
Greek Cup: 2019–20 ; runner-up: 2020–21

Individual
Greek Cup Final Most Valuable Player: 2019–20

References

External links
 
 
 

1997 births
Sportspeople from Leskovac
Living people
Association football wingers
Serbian footballers
Serbia under-21 international footballers
Serbia international footballers
FK Car Konstantin players
FK Dinamo Vranje players
FK Radnički Niš players
Olympiacos F.C. players
CD Leganés players
FC Ural Yekaterinburg players
Serbian League players
Serbian First League players
Serbian SuperLiga players
Super League Greece players
Segunda División players
Russian Premier League players
Serbian expatriate footballers
Expatriate footballers in Greece
Serbian expatriate sportspeople in Greece
Expatriate footballers in Spain
Serbian expatriate sportspeople in Spain
Expatriate footballers in Russia
Serbian expatriate sportspeople in Russia